The Awards of the Israeli Television Academy  are annual awards for excellence in the Israeli television industry, awarded by the Israeli Academy of Film and Television.

History
Until 2003, awards were given during the Ophir Awards (Israeli Film Awards) ceremony. The Israeli Television Academy awards have been granted since the first ceremony in 2003, hosted by Yael Abecassis.

Since 2020, the Best Comedy Series award has been divided into Best Sitcom and Best Comedy Drama.

Since 2018, the ceremony has been broadcast on Kan 11.

Notable winners

 Eretz Nehederet has won the award 13 times, first as Best Comedy Series, and later as Best Entertainment Show, Best Satire Show, and Best Sketch Show. The show has also won awards for Best Makeup and Best Script. 
 Assi Cohen has won the award eight times, both for Best Actor – Comedy Series and for Best Script. 
 Keren Mor has won the Best Actress – Comedy Series award three times, all for Ktsarim. 
 Sayed Kashua has won the Best Script award four times. 
 Yehuda Levi has won the Best Actor award three times, in three different Drama categories. 
 Alon Zingman has won the Best Directing award three times, for Shtisel and Manayek.

Lists of winners

|-
|

Best Drama Series
 Shabatot VeHagim (2003)
 Meorav Yerushalmi (2004)
 Ahava Ze Koev (2005)
 BeTipul (2006)
 A Touch Away (2007)
 Walk the Dog (2008)
 Srugim (2009)
 Prisoners of War (2010)
 Yellow Peppers (2011)
 30 Shakh LeSha'a (2012)
 Shtisel (2013)
 Ish Hashuv Meod (2014)
 Fauda (2015)
 Uri ve Ella (2016)
 Fauda (2017)
 On the Spectrum (2018)
 Our Boys (2019)
 Manayek (2020)
 Alumim (2021)
|

Best Comedy Series / Comedy Drama / Sitcom
 Shotetut (2003)
 M.K. 22 (2004)
 Eretz Nehederet (2005)
 Mummy (2006) (as Best Comedy Drama)
 Mesudarim (2007)
 Hakol Dvash (2008)
 Red Band (2009)
 Ramzor (2010)
 Arab Labor (2011)
 Arab Labor (2012)
 The Parliament (2013)
 The Parliament (2014)
 Killing Grandma (2015)
 My Successful Sisters (2016)
 Shababnikim (2017)
 Kacha Ze (2018)
 Nehama (2019)
 Chazarot (Best Comedy Drama) · Kupa Rashit (Best Sitcom) (2020)
 HaMefakedet (Best Comedy Drama) · Kupa Rashit (Best Sitcom) (2021)

See also
 Ophir Awards
 Television in Israel

References

External links
Official site of the Israeli Film and Television Academy

Television awards
Israeli awards
Television in Israel
Awards established in 2003
2003 establishments in Israel